James Henry Gribben (April, 1839 - August 6, 1878) was an American soldier who fought in the American Civil War. Gribben received his country's highest award for bravery during combat, the Medal of Honor. Gribben's medal was won for capturing the flag of the Confederate 12th Virginia Infantry at the Battle of Sayler's Creek in Virginia on April 6, 1865. He was honored with the award on May 3, 1865.

Gribben was born in Ireland. He joined the US Army from New York City in September 1861, and was discharged in June 1865. He was buried at Cypress Hills Cemetery in Brooklyn. Green-Wood Cemetery was mistakenly recorded on his death certificate.

Medal of Honor citation

See also
List of American Civil War Medal of Honor recipients: G–L

References

1839 births
1889 deaths
American Civil War recipients of the Medal of Honor
Irish emigrants to the United States (before 1923)
Irish-born Medal of Honor recipients
People of New York (state) in the American Civil War
Union Army officers
United States Army Medal of Honor recipients